Van Trump may refer to:

People
Van Trump (surname)

Places
United States
 Van Trump Creek, Washington
 Van Trump Falls, Washington
 Van Trump Glacier, Mount Rainier, Washington

See also
 Trump (disambiguation)